The following lists events that happened during 1969 in the Grand Duchy of Luxembourg.

Incumbents

Events

January – March
 6 February – Pierre Werner forms a new government, with Eugène Schaus of the Democratic Party replacing the LSAP's Henry Cravatte as Werner's deputy.
 24 March - Prince Félix resigns from the Council of State.
 29 March – Representing Luxembourg, Romuald Figuier finishes eleventh in the Eurovision Song Contest 1969 with the song Catherine (song).

April – June
 10 April – At football, Luxembourg beats Mexico 2–1, recording Luxembourg's first victory in international football since 1963.

July – September
 1 July - Maurice Sevenig is appointed President of the Council of State, replacing Félix Welter, who resigned the position the previous day.
 8 July – A law introducing value added tax is passed.

October – December
 22 November – A Luxair flight from Frankfurt hits a snowback upon touchdown at Luxembourg-Findel.  No-one is killed, but the plane is written off.
 December – Prime Minister Pierre Werner presents the Werner Plan on economic and monetary union in the European Union.

Births
 22 May – Nancy Kemp-Arendt, athlete and politician
 29 May - Sandrine Cantoreggi, violinist

Deaths

Footnotes

References